The Server Side Public License (SSPL) is a source-available software license introduced by MongoDB Inc. in 2018. It includes most of the text and provisions of the GNU Affero General Public License version 3 (AGPL v3), and primarily replaces section 13 "Remote Network Interaction; Use with the GNU General Public License." with a new section that requires that anyone who offers the functionality of SSPL-licensed software to third-parties as a service must release the entirety of their source code, including all software, APIs, and other software that would be required for a user to run an instance of the service themselves, under the SSPL. In contrast, the AGPL v3's section 13 covers only the program itself (the copyrightable work licensed under AGPL v3).

The SSPL is not recognized as free software by multiple parties, including the Open Source Initiative (OSI) and multiple major Linux vendors, as the aforementioned provision is discriminatory towards specific fields of use.

License terms 
The SSPL is based on the GNU Affero General Public License (AGPL), with a modified Section 13 that requires that those making SSPL-licensed software available to third-parties (modified or not) as part of a "service" must release the source code for the entirety of the service, including without limitation all "management software, user interfaces, application program interfaces, automation software, monitoring software, backup software, storage software and hosting software, all such that a user could run an instance of the service using the Service Source Code you make available", under the SSPL. The chapter structure of the Server Side Public License is identical to that to the AGPL, except that the GPL preamble and application instructions are stripped from the license text.

MongoDB Inc. stated that a similar clause for network software in the AGPL (which requires that those using the AGPL-licensed software over a network have the ability to obtain the source code for the software, as used) had an unclear scope, and that the SSPL's version "clearly and explicitly sets forth the conditions to offering the licensed program as a third-party service".

Licensed software 
In October 2018, the MongoDB database was relicensed under the SSPL. Debian, Red Hat Enterprise Linux, and Fedora subsequently dropped MongoDB, citing concerns about the SSPL. Amazon released a partially compatible but proprietary service named DocumentDB.

In November 2020, Graylog announced that version 4.0 of its source-available release will be licensed under the SSPL.

In January 2021, Elastic NV announced that future versions of their code in Elasticsearch and Kibana, licensed until then under the open-source Apache 2.0 License, would be dual-licensed instead under SSPL and their own Elastic license. Critics of the re-licensing decision predicted that it would harm Elastic's ecosystem, and Amazon responded with plans to fork the projects for continued development of versions licensed as Apache 2.0. Other users of the Elasticsearch ecosystem, led by Amazon Web Services, and including Logz.io, CrateDB, Red Hat and Aiven, also collaborated on the open source fork, leading to the creation of the OpenSearch software.

Certification with OSI 
In 2018, MongoDB submitted the license to the Open Source Initiative (OSI) for approval. The company withdrew its submission in 2019. In January 2021, following the re-licensing move by Elastic, OSI released a statement declaring that the SSPL does not comply with its Open Source Definition because it discriminates against specific fields of endeavor, describing it as a "fauxpen" source license.

References

External links 

 Server Side Public License text

Copyleft
Computer law
Software licenses
Copyleft software licenses